Ethnic Japanese may refer to:
 Japanese people, an ethnic group native to Japan
Yamato people, the dominant native ethnic group of Japan
Ainu people, an indigenous people in Japan and Russia
Ryukyuan people, indigenous peoples of the Ryukyu Islands between the islands of Kyushu and Taiwan
 Japanese diaspora, emigrants from Japan and their descendants that reside in a foreign country
Ryukyuan diaspora, emigrants of Ryukyuan ethnicity and their descendants who reside outside of the Ryukyu Islands

See also
Ethnic issues in Japan
Demographics of Japan
Foreign-born Japanese
Japanese (disambiguation)
Japan (disambiguation)